The 2016 Arizona Wildcats football team represented the University of Arizona in the 2016 season. The season was the Wildcats's 117th overall, 39th as a member of the Pac-12 Conference, and its sixth within the Pac-12 South Division. The team played their home games at Arizona Stadium in Tucson, Arizona for the 88th straight year. They were led by fifth-year head coach Rich Rodriguez. They finished the season 3–9, 1–8 in Pac-12 play to finish in last place in the South Division.

Previous season and offseason

The Arizona Wildcats finished the 2015 season with a 7–6 (3–6 Pac-12) record, fifth in the Pac-12 standings (behind with co-Pac-12 South Champions USC and Utah and behind with UCLA and Arizona State) and as the 2015 New Mexico Bowl Champions.  Despite a plague of injuries on offense and defense, with over 23 starters missing significant playing time due to injury and 30 freshmen seeing meaningful playing time, head coach Rich Rodriguez led the Wildcats to a 7+ win season for the 2nd time and a bowl game for the 4th time in his 4th as the Arizona head coach. The Wildcats concluded their season with an improbable victory at the 2015 New Mexico Bowl against New Mexico; 45–37 victory over the Lobos.

Preseason

Draft picks
The NFL Draft will take place from April 28 through 30, 2016 and will be hosted by the Auditorium Theatre in Chicago, IL.  The two following members of 2015 Arizona Wildcats football team were selected in the 2016 NFL Draft.

Departures
The Wildcats would lose twenty-one senior football players to graduation as well as two junior football players (Junior linebacker and 2014 Pac-12 Defensive Player of the Year, Scooby Wright and unanimous first team All-American junior wide receiver Cayleb Jones) who would choose to forego their senior season in pursuit of an earlier NFL career. The Wildcats would lose six more players from the 2015 team due to various reasons (transfers and withdrawals will be filled out once spring practice occurs). Notable departures from the 2015 squad included.

Transfers
In addition to the 2016 recruiting class, Arizona added two transfer football players in 2016 season. Linebacker Michael Barton transferred to Arizona in January from California. As a graduate transfer, Barton is immediately eligible to play in 2016, and he will have 1 year of his eligibility remaining. In 2011, Barton was a 4-star recruit out of De LaSalle High School in Concord, CA.

Wide receiver Zach Benjamin transferred to Arizona in May from Florida. Benjamin is immediately eligible to play in 2016, and he will have 2 years of eligibility remaining. In 2013, Benjamin was a 3-star recruit out of De LaSalle High School in Tampa, FL.

Recruiting

Position key

Arizona inked two junior college transfer players in February 2016, including  2-star walk-on safety Jalen Jenkins (Mesa CC) and 2-star wide receiver Shawn Poindexter (Glendale CC). All junior college transfers will enroll at Arizona in February 2016, participate in spring practice and be eligible to play in 2016.

Four freshmen signed financial aid agreements with Arizona in 2015 and will join with the junior college transfer as January 2016 enrollees. Financial aid agreements are binding on schools but non-binding on players. Early freshmen enrollees include 4-star offensive guard Michael Eletise (Kaiser) and 4-star quarterback Khalil Tate (Junipero Serra). Additionally, 4-star inside linebacker Kahi Neves (Brighton) expected to sign a financial aid agreement and enroll in January 2016.

National Signing Day is February 3, 2016. The incoming players listed below include the three junior college transfers that have signed binding letters of intent during the junior college transfer signing period, and the two incoming freshmen who have signed financial aid agreements to enroll in January 2016.

The Wildcats would go on to land another top 10 recruiting class in 2016 (#44 by Scout, #51 by Rivals, #45 by ESPN, and #43 by 247). The Wildcats has finish another top 10 in the Pac-12 recruitment class (#No. 9 by 247, Scout and ESPN, and #No.10 by Rivals)

RB Russell Halimon and WR Jessie Britt will grayshirt for the 2016 season because their enrollments were delayed and they did not receive scholarships.

2016 spring football practice
The 2016 Wildcats had spring practice from February 12, 2016 to March 25, 2016.

2016 returning missionaries
The returning missionaries will be filled in when national signing day occurs. Arizona had seven returning players on offense, five on defense and five on special teams that started games in 2015.

Offense

Defense

Special teams

† Indicates player was a starter in 2015 but missed all of 2016 due to injury.

Fall camp
Pac-12 media days are set for July 14–15 in Hollywood, California. Prior to media days,   The Wildcats were also picked by the Pac-12 media to finish fourth at South Division in the conference standings and received 87 first place votes, with the remainder going to top-picked UCLA in the South Division.

Fall camp is scheduled for August.

Personnel

Coaching staff

Coaching staff sources: ArizonaWildcats.com

Coaching changes
 December 21, 2015 – Arizona cornerbacks coach David Lockwood will not returning in next season.
 December 21, 2015 – Arizona officially promoted from football analyst to assistant coach/safeties Jahmile Addae, replacing David Lockwood.
 January 4, 2016 – Arizona defensive coordinator Jeff Casteel and defensive line coach Bill Kirelawich will not returning to UofA next season.
 January 15, 2016 – Matt Caponi leaving Arizona to be West Virginia's safeties coach, reunited with Tony Gibson.
 January 17, 2016 – Arizona hires Boise State defensive coordinator Marcel Yates, replacing Jeff Casteel.
 January 17, 2016 – Arizona hires San José defensive coach Donte Williams to be a defensive assistant for cornerbacks.
 February 10, 2016 – Arizona officially promoted from football analyst to new defensive lineman coach Vince Amey, replacing Bill Kirelawich.

Roster

Aug 8, 2016 – Zach Hemmila died in his sleep.
 – Orlando Bradford has dismissed from the football program after the arrest for domestic violence charges.

Depth chart

Depth Chart Source: 2016 Arizona Wildcats Football Fact Book

Injury report

Regular season

Schedule
Arizona announced its 2016 football schedule on November 24, 2015. The 2016 schedule consists of 7 home, 4 away, and 1 neutral site game in the regular season. Arizona will face all five Southern Division opponents: Arizona State, Colorado, UCLA, USC and Utah. They will also face four Northern Division opponents: Oregon State, Stanford, Washington, and Washington State. Arizona is not scheduled to play Pac-12 North opponents California or Oregon.

The team will scheduled to play three non-conference games, two home games against Hawaii of the MWC,   Grambling State of the FCS' SWAC and travel to Glendale, AZ to play BYU of the (NCAA Division I FBS independent) for the Cactus Kickoff at University of Phoenix Stadium, a non—conference game at a neutral site one neutral site game.

Schedule Source: FBschedules.com

Game summaries

vs BYU 

Sources:

Game Stats:
Passing: 
BYU – T. Hill (21–29, 202 YDS, 1 TD)

Arizona – A. Solomon (20–30, 213 YDS, 2 INT)
Rushing:
BYU – M. Carter (13 CAR, 43 YDS, 1 TD)

Arizona – N. Wilson (17 CAR, 138 YDS, 2 TD)
Receiving: 
BYU – M. Laulu-Pututau (4 REC, 49 YDS)

Arizona – N. Phillips (7 REC, 69 YDS)
Interceptions:
BYU  –

Arizona –

Grambling State  

Sources: 

Arizona played their home opener against Grambling State, which was the Wildcats' first home game since the 2011–2013's expansion to over 56,000 in Tucson. This was the first-ever meeting between the two teams. (Arizona attempted to hire legendary longtime Grambling head coach Eddie Robinson in 1968, which would have made him the first African American head coach of an NCAA Division I-A football program at a predominantly White college, but Robinson declined the offer.)

Grambling opened the 2015 season in the Southwestern Athletic Conference and finished the 2015 season with a 9–3 (6–0 SWAC) record and ranked #21 in the final regular season FCS poll, with a 73–14 loss at Cal. The Tigers then lost to Bethune-Cookman before winning nine straight games to reach the SWAC championship game, which they lost to Alcorn State.

Brandon Dawkins, starting after Anu Solomon hurt his knee during practice Wednesday, ran for two touchdowns and threw for another, all in the second half, and Arizona rallied from an 18-point deficit and escaped with a 31–21 victory.

The Wildcats (1–1), 45-point favorites, trailed 21–3 at halftime and looked in danger of their first-ever loss to an FCS school.

But the Tigers (1–1), who lost quarterback DeVante Kincade (a transfer from Ole Miss) to injury late in the first half, committed six second-half turnovers, four of them in a row in the third quarter. Backup Trevon Cherry threw three interceptions and fumbled the ball away once.

Dawkins, a redshirt sophomore, completed 15 of 29 passes for 223 yards and gained 97 yards in 16 carries. He scored on runs of 21 and 2 yards and threw a 34-yard touchdown pass to Trey Griffey. Nick Wilson rushed for 116 yards, including an 11-yard TD run.

Kincade completed 15 of 19 passes for 193 yards and two scores before leaving with a leg injury with 2:38 to play in the second quarter. Grambling's Chad Williams caught 13 passes for 152 yards. (Kincade was once a highly ranked three-star prospect, the composite 14th-best dual-threat QB in the nation. He ended up going to Ole Miss, spending two years with the Rebels (11 games, 37 rushes, 35 passing attempts), but transferred to Grambling after the 2015 season.)

Cody Ippolito recovered two fumbles, both leading to Arizona touchdowns; later in the fourth quarter, Ippolito was ejected after the officials ruled that he targeted Cherry. Ippolito's helmet contacted Cherry's chin after he released a pass.

The Tigers took the opening kickoff and went 81 yards in seven plays, Kincade throwing a 2-yard touchdown pass to Verlan Hunter.

The Wildcats had Grambling pinned in a third-and-29 situation at the Tigers 17 when Kincade threw short to Martez Carter, who raced down the sideline 49 yards to the 34. Six plays later, Kincade threw 26 yards to Devohn Lindsey for a touchdown that made it 14–0 with 11:55 left in the half.

Dawkins’ 42-yard run highlighted a drive to the Grambling 6 but, on fourth-and-1, Wilson was hit in the backfield and fumbled the ball away.

A 70-yard pass from Dawkins to Samajie Grant led to Arizona's only first-half points, Josh Pollock's 31-yard field goal.

Arizona improved to 5–0 in home openers under coach Rodriguez. "I just love stress," he said. "Let's have a stressful game against a I-AA. Give them credit. Their coaching staff did a great job. They played really hard. Their skill players, particularly their quarterback and their running back, were every bit as good as I thought. They outplayed us for a large part of the game…At halftime, I wasn’t going to scream and yell…We just challenged them to see what they’re made of a little bit. Go out and execute, take pride in our conditioning. It was a battle the whole day."

Grambling's legendary World Famed Tiger Band performed with the Arizona marching band for the National Anthem, and also during the halftime show in Tucson. Both bands famously performed for the first NFL Super Bowl in 1967.

Game Stats:
Passing: 
Grambling State – T. Cherry (16–25, 209 YDS, 3 INT)

Arizona – B. Dawkins (15–29, 223 YDS, 1 TD)
Rushing:
Grambling State – M. Carter (13 CAR, 43 YDS, 1 TD)

Arizona- N. Wilson (24 CAR, 116 YDS, 1 TD)
Receiving: 
Grambling State –  C. Williams (13 REC, 152 YDS)

Arizona-  S. Grant (5 REC, 95 YDS)
Interceptions:
Grambling State –

Arizona –

Hawaii  

Sources:
 

The last time these two teams met was 1998. Arizona leads the all-time series 4–0 against the Warriors. Former Hawai'i quarterback Nick Rolovich enters his first season as head coach. Hawai'i opens its season on Aug. 27 against Cal in Sydney, Australia. Arizona will be looking to get consecutive wins over Hawaii for the first time since 1951–52, and will be hoping to get their fifth win of the season in the series all time. In 1998, UofA won the previous meeting over Hawaii 28–6 in Honolulu.

Game Stats
Passing:
Hawaii – D. Brown (10–18, 144 YDS)  I. Woolsey (11/25, 117 YDS, 1 TD,  1 INT)

Arizona-  B. Dawkins (16–21, 235 YDS, 1 TD)

Rushing:
Hawaii –  S. Lakalaka (16 CAR, 63 Yards, 2 TDS)

Arizona-  J. J. Taylor (18 CAR, 168 Yards, 1 TD)  B. Dawkins (15 CAR, 118 Yards, 3 TDS)  T. Johnson (2 CAR,  27 Yards, 1 TDS)

Receiving: 
Hawaii –  J. Ursua (5 REC, 83 Yards, 1 TD)

Arizona-  S. Brown (5 REC, 92 Yards, 1 TD)
Interceptions:
Hawaii – None

Arizona – D. Flannigan-Fowles (1–0–0)

Washington

Sources: 

The Wildcats open conference play at home against the Huskies for the 32nd time. In 2015, UA lost in Seattle 49–3. UA won in 2014 in Tucson. Washington leads the all-time series 19–11–1.

Game Stats
Passing:
Washington – J. Browning (14–21, 160 Yards, 2 TDS, INT)

Arizona – B. Dawkins (19–31, 167 YDS, 1 TD, 1 INT)

Rushing:
Washington – L. Coleman (11 CAR, 181 YDS, 1 TD)

Arizona – B. Dawkins (13 CAR, 176 YDS, 2 TD)

Receiving:
Washington – C. McClatcher (2 REC, 72 YDS)

Arizona – S. Brown (7 REC, 114 YDS)

Interceptions:
Washington

Arizona

at UCLA

Sources: 

The Wildcats first road conference game is against UCLA for the 40th time. Arizona will be looking to get their first road win in Pasadena since 2010. The Bruins won in Tucson in 2015 and lead the all-time series 22–15–2. UA has lost four in a row to the Bruins.

Game Stats

Passing:
Arizona – B. Dawkins (8–17, 73 YDS, 1 TD)

UCLA – J. Rosen (20–37, 350 YDS, 3 TD)
Rushing:
Arizona – K. Tate (15 CAR, 79 YDS)

UCLA – N. Starks (17 CAR, 80 YDS, 1 TD)
Receiving:
Arizona – S. Brown (4 REC, 50 YDS, 1 TD)

UCLA – K. Walker III (4 REC, 114 YDS, 2 TD)

Interceptions:
Arizona

UCLA

at Utah

Sources: 

Arizona will visit Utah for the 92nd time in Salt Lake City, UT. Arizona will be looking to get consecutive wins over Utah for the first time since 1951–52, and will be hoping to get their five win in five seasons in the series all time. Arizona beat the then-10th-ranked Utes in Tucson in double-overtime in 2015, ensuring the Wildcats a six-win season and bowl eligibility. Arizona has won four in a row in the series and is 4–1 against the Utes since they joined the Pac-12 in 2011. Utah leads the all-time series 20–19–2.

Game Stats
Passing:
Arizona – B. Dawkins (11–20, 243 YDS, 1 TD, 2 INTs)

Utah – T. Williams (13–29, 245 YDS, 1 TD)

Rushing:
Arizona – B. Dawkins (14 CAR, 49 YDS, 1 TD)

Utah – A. Shyne (19 CAR, 101 YDS, 1 TD)

Receiving:
Arizona – T. Griffey (4 REC, 109 YDS)

Utah – E. Moeai (3 REC, 81 YDS)

Interceptions:
Arizona –

Utah –

USC

Sources:

The Wildcats have lost three in a row to the Trojans but all three games were close. UA lost 38–30 in Los Angeles in 2015, 28–26 in Tucson in 2014 and 38–31 in L.A. 2013. Arizona's last win in the series came in 2012 in Tucson. USC leads the all-time series 31–8.

Game Stats
Passing:
Rushing:

Receiving:Interceptions:StanfordSources:Stanford leads the all-time series 15–14 after a 55–17 win in 2015. Arizona has lost four in a row and six of the last seven to the Cardinal. Arizona will enter their eighth game of the season against their Pac-12 North inter-divisional opponent, Stanford for the 37th time in Tucson, and the Wildcats will be hoping to get their first win over the Stanford since 1996.Game StatsPassing:Rushing:Receiving:Interceptions:at Washington StateSources:Arizona lost last season in Tucson and two of three but has won six of eight in the series. UA has won four in a row in Pullman against the Cougars. UA leads the all-time series 26–15. Arizona will visit the Washington State for the 42nd time.Game StatsPassing:Rushing:'''Receiving:

Interceptions:

Colorado

Sources:

at Oregon State

Sources:

Arizona State

The 90th Territorial Cup game will be hosting their biggest rivals, Arizona State on senior night in Tucson on the Friday of Thanksgiving weekend. Arizona leads the all-time series 48–40–1. ASU won the 2015 game in Tempe and three of four in the series since Todd Graham and Rich Rodriguez were hired.

Arizona did not throw a pass in the second half.

Game MVP - Brandon Dawkins

Samajie Grant 176 rushing yards, Zach Green 126 rushing yards, school-record 511 rushing yards

Attendance

Statistics

Team

Offense

Defense

Key: POS: Position, SOLO: Solo Tackles, AST: Assisted Tackles, TOT: Total Tackles, TFL: Tackles-for-loss, SACK: Quarterback Sacks, INT: Interceptions, Yards: Yards, TDS: Touchdowns, BU: Passes Broken Up, PD: Passes Defended, QBH: Quarterback Hits, FF: Forced Fumbles, FR: Fumbles Recovered, BLK: Kicks or Punts Blocked, SAF: Safeties

Special teams

Non-conference opponents

Pac-12 opponents

Score total by quarters

Awards and honors

Weekly awards

Week 1
Nick Wilson
Coaches Offensive Player of the Week (Week 1 vs BYU) 
Jamie Nunley
 Scout Team Offensive Player of the Week (Week 1 vs BYU)
Matthew Stagg
Scout Team Defensive Player of the Week (Week 1 vs BYU)
Dane Cruikshank
Coaches Defensive Player of the Week (Week 1 vs BYU)
Issac Steele
Scout Special Teams Player of the Week (Week 1 vs BYU)
Justin Belknap
 Hard Edge Player of the Week (Week 1 vs BYU)
Jalen Cochran
 Student Player of the Week (Week 1 vs BYU)
Zach Werlinger
 Community Service Award (Week 1 vs BYU) 

Week 2
Parker Zellers
 Hard Edge Player of the Week (Week 2 vs Grambling State) 
Bryson Cain
 Scout  Team Offensive Player of the Week (Week 2 vs. Grambling State)
Richard Merritt
 Co-Scout Team Defensive Player of the Week (Week 2 vs. Grambling State)
Lee Anderson III
 Co-Scout Team Defensive Player of the Week (Week 2 vs. Grambling State)
Richie Estrada
 Student Player of the Week (Week 2 vs. Grambling State) 
Nick Reinhardt
 Scout Special Team Player of the Week (Week 2 vs. Grambling State)

Week 3 
Brandon Dawkins
 Co-Coaches Offensive Player of the Week (Week 3 vs Hawaii) 
J. J. Taylor
 Co-Coaches Offensive Player of the Week (Week 3 vs Hawaii)
Demetrius Flannigan-Fowles
 Coaches Defensive Player of the Week (Week 3 vs Hawaii)
Josh Pollack
 Coaches Special Teams Player of the Week (Week 3 vs Hawaii)
Nate Phillips
 Hard Edge Player of the Week (Week 3 vs Hawaii)
Tyrell Johnson
 Student Player of the Week (Week 3 vs Hawaii)
Zach Benjamin
 Scout Offensive Player of the Week (Week 3 vs Hawaii)
Larry Tharpe Jr.
 Scout Defensive Player of the Week (Week 3 vs Hawaii)
Jarrius Wallace
 Scout Special Teams Player of the Week (Week 3 vs Hawaii)

 Week 7

 Week 8

 Week 9

 Week 10

 Week 11

 Week 12

 Week 13

 Week 14
 Bye

Midseason awards

Award watch lists
Anu Solomon
Maxwell Award Watch list – College Football Player of the YearWalter Camp Award Watchlist – Player of the Year Polynesian College Football Player of the Year Award Watchlist 
Davey O'Brien Award Watch list – the collegiate American football player judged to be the best of all NCAA quarterbacksNick Wilson
Doak Walker Award Watch list – The nation's top college football running backPaul Magloire Jr.
Chuck Bednarik Award Watch List

Postseason games

Senior Bowl

All Star Game

Media affiliates

Radio

ESPN Radio – (ESPN Tucson 1490 AM & 104.09 FM) – Nationwide (Dish Network, Sirius XM, TuneIn radio and iHeartRadio)
KCUB 1290 AM – Football Radio Show – (Tucson, AZ)
KHYT – 107.5 FM (Tucson, AZ)
KTKT 990 AM  – La Hora de Los Gatos (Spanish)'' – (Tucson, AZ)
KGME 910 AM – (IMG Sports Network) – (Phoenix, AZ)
KTAN 1420 AM – (Sierra Vista, AZ)
KDAP 96.5 FM (Douglas, Arizona)
KWRQ 102.3 FM – (Safford, AZ/Thatcher, AZ)
KIKO 1340 AM – (Globe, AZ)
KVWM 970 AM – (Show Low, AZ/Pinetop-Lakeside, AZ)
XENY 760 – (Nogales, Sonora) (Spanish)

TV
KOLD  (CBS)
KGUN (ESPN College Football on ABC/ABC)
FOX (Fox Sports Media Group)
FS1 (Fox Sports Media Group)
ESPN (ESPN Family)
ESPN2 (ESPN Family)
ESPNU (ESPN Family)
CBS Sports Network
Pac-12 Network (Pac-12 Arizona)

NFL draft

2017 NFL Draft
The 2017 NFL Draft was held at the Philadelphia Museum of Art in Philadelphia on April 27 through April 29, 2017. The following Arizona players were either selected or signed as free agents following the draft.

References

Arizona
Arizona Wildcats football seasons
Arizona Wildcats football